The Bryant-Lasater House is a historic house at 770 North Main Street in Mulberry, Arkansas.  It is a -story wood-frame structure, set on a foundation of molded concrete blocks, with a shallow-pitch pyramidal roof (pierced on each side by a hip-roof dormer), and a hip-roof porch extending across the front.  A rear porch has been enclosed.  Built c. 1900, the house is locally distinctive for its architecture, as a particularly large example of a pyramid-roofed house, and for its historical role as the home of a succession of locally prominent doctors, including Dr. O. J. Kirksey, who operated a maternity hospital in the house.

The house was listed on the National Register of Historic Places in 2007.

See also
National Register of Historic Places listings in Crawford County, Arkansas

References

Houses on the National Register of Historic Places in Arkansas
Houses completed in 1900
Houses in Crawford County, Arkansas
National Register of Historic Places in Crawford County, Arkansas